Edana of Ireland (also Edaene, Etaoin, Edna, Eidyn) was an Irish monastic who lived at the confluence of the River Shannon and Boyle River during the sixth century. Her name means "little fire" or "little flame". She could be confused with St. Modwenna of Whitby, although there is no evidence supporting it.

Saint Patrick ordained Edana as a monastic. She is the patron saint of several parishes in western Ireland including Tuam and Elphin . A "famous holy well", known for its healing properties, was named for her. Some sources state that the city of Edinburgh, close to the site where she founded a convent, was named for her. Her feast day is July 5.

References

6th-century Christian saints
6th-century Irish people
Female saints of medieval Ireland
Medieval Irish saints
5th-century Irish women